Hamels Hoxha (born 2 July 1992) is an Albanian footballer who most recently played as a defender for Greek lower league side Kozani. He is also a member of the Albanian U-19s and has played 3 games without scoring a goal

Honours 
Skënderbeu Korçë
 Albanian Superliga (1): 2010–11

References

External links

1992 births
Living people
Footballers from Tirana
Albanian footballers
Association football midfielders
Association football defenders
Albania youth international footballers
Iraklis Thessaloniki F.C. players
C.D. Nacional players
KF Skënderbeu Korçë players
KF Laçi players
Kozani F.C. players
Kategoria Superiore players
Gamma Ethniki players
Albanian expatriate footballers
Albanian expatriate sportspeople in Portugal
Expatriate footballers in Portugal
Albanian expatriate sportspeople in Greece
Expatriate footballers in Greece